Joël Moïse Babanda (born 12 January 1984 in Garoua) is a Cameroonian footballer who is currently playing for Olympique Khouribga.

Career
Babanda began his career by Racing FC Bafoussam before moving to Cotonsport Garoua in 2005. He moved from Cotonsport Garoua to Algerian club ASO Chlef in January 2008.

References

External links
DZ Foot

1984 births
Living people
Cameroonian footballers
Association football forwards
Coton Sport FC de Garoua players
Expatriate footballers in Algeria
Cameroonian expatriate sportspeople in Algeria
ASO Chlef players
Expatriate footballers in Morocco
Cameroonian expatriate sportspeople in Morocco
Olympique Club de Khouribga players
Cameroon A' international footballers
2011 African Nations Championship players